Pothyne convexifrons is a species of beetle in the family Cerambycidae. It was described by Gardner in 1930.

References

convexifrons
Beetles described in 1930